Ungheni is a town in Mureș County, in Transylvania, Romania. Until 1925 its Romanian name was Nirașteu.

Six villages are administered by the town:
 Cerghid (Nagycserged)
 Cerghizel (Kiscserged)
 Morești (Malomfalva)
 Recea (Recsa)
 Șăușa (Sóspatak)
 Vidrasău (Vidrátszeg)

Location

The town is bordered by the following communes: to the north by Band and Pănet, to the south by Suplac and Mica, to the east by Cristești, and to the west by Sânpaul.

Demographics

The town has a population of 6,945. The ethnic breakdown is as follows:
 Romanians: 5,053 (76.3%)
 Roma: 984 (14.85%)
 Hungarians: 576 (8.69%)
 Others: 4 (0.06%)

Natives
 Erasmus Julius Nyárády (1881–1966), botanist

References

Towns in Romania
Populated places in Mureș County
Localities in Transylvania
Székely communities